Marissa Danielle Diggs (born April 8, 1992) is an American retired soccer player who played as a defender. She last played for the Houston Dash of the National Women's Soccer League.

Early life
Diggs was born in Rowlett, Texas, and played high school soccer at Rowlett High School. Diggs played club soccer for the Dallas Sting.

Collegiate career
Diggs attended the University of Central Florida where she played as a defender for the Knights. Diggs was a starter in all four collegiate seasons.

Club career

Houston Dash, 2014
Diggs was selected in the second round of the National Women's Soccer League college entry draft by the Houston Dash and played for the team during the 2014 season. She announced her retirement from professional soccer prior to the start of the 2015 season.

Awards and honors

Individual 

 Third Team NSCAA All-American: 2013
 American Conference Defender of the Year: 2013
 First Team All-American Conference: 2013
 Second Team NSCAA All-American: 2012
 Conference USA Defender of the Year: 2012
 First Team All-Conference USA: 2012
 First Team NSCAA All-Central Region: 2011
 First Team All-Conference USA: 2011

See also

References

External links 
 Houston Dash player profile
 UCF player profile
 

1992 births
Living people
National Women's Soccer League players
Houston Dash players
UCF Knights women's soccer players
American women's soccer players
Houston Dash draft picks
Women's association football defenders